William Coates may refer to:

 Sir William Coates, 1st Baronet (1866–1932), Irish stockbroker, Lord Mayor of Belfast, 1920–1923, 1929–1931
 William Coates (businessman) (1882–1963), British civil servant and businessman
 William Coates (longevity claimant) (1911–2004), American alleged centenarian
 William Peyton Coates (1883–1963), Irish labour activist and communist
 William Coates (technician) (1919–1993), science communicator, lecturer and technician
 William Paul Coates (born 1946), African-American publisher and father of Ta-Nehisi Coates

See also
Coates (disambiguation)